Broughderg may refer to:

Broughderg, County Cavan, a townland in County Cavan, Ireland
Broughderg, County Fermanagh, a townland in County Fermanagh, Northern Ireland
Broughderg, County Tyrone, a townland in County Tyrone, Northern Ireland